Bruce Rankin may refer to:
 Bruce Rankin (footballer), English footballer
 Bruce Irving Rankin, Canadian diplomat